The Chiayi Botanical Garden is a botanical garden in East District, Chiayi City, Taiwan belongs to the Taiwan Forestry Research Institute of Council of Agriculture.

History
The botanical garden was established in 1908.

Geology
The botanical garden spreads across an 8.6 hectares of land. It is an experimental ground for planning and developing economical tropical trees. Currently there are 140 tree species in the garden, which is further classified into 47 families and 107 classes.

See also
 List of parks in Taiwan

References

1908 establishments in Taiwan
Botanical gardens in Taiwan
East District, Chiayi
Landforms of Chiayi
Tourist attractions in Chiayi